The Battle of Dresden (26–27 August 1813) was a major engagement of the Napoleonic Wars. The battle took place around the city of Dresden in modern-day Germany. With the recent addition of Austria, the Sixth Coalition felt emboldened in their quest to expel the French from Central Europe. Despite being heavily outnumbered, French forces under Napoleon scored a victory against the Army of Bohemia led by Generalissimo Karl von Schwarzenberg. However, Napoleon's victory did not lead to the collapse of the coalition, and the weather and the uncommitted Russian reserves who formed an effective rear-guard precluded a major pursuit. Three days after the battle, the Allies surrounded and destroyed a French corps advancing into their line of withdrawal at the Battle of Kulm.

Prelude
On 16 August, Napoleon had sent Marshal Saint-Cyr's corps to fortify and hold Dresden in order to hinder allied movements and to serve as a possible base for his own manoeuvres. He planned to strike against the interior lines of his enemies and defeat them in detail, before they could combine their full strength. He had a field army of 442,810 men and 1,284 guns in 559 battalions and 395 squadrons against Allied field forces totaling 512,113 men in 556 battalions, 572 squadrons and 68 Cossack regiments, and 1,380 guns.

The Coalition avoided battle with Napoleon himself, choosing to attack his subordinate commanders as per the Trachenberg Plan. On 23 August, at the Battle of Grossbeeren, south of Berlin, Crown Prince Charles of Sweden (formerly French Marshal Bernadotte, Napoleon's own Marshal) defeated his old comrade Marshal Oudinot. On 26 August, Prussian Marshal Blücher crushed Marshal MacDonald's army at the Battle of Katzbach.

Battle 

On 25 August, the three monarchs—Alexander I of Russia, Francis II of Austria, and Frederick William III of Prussia—and their staffs assembled on an overlook of the city to discuss their strategy.  The city's weak defenses were clear from this vantage point: the French and Saxon garrison of 20,000 men under Marshal Saint-Cyr could not hope to hold a city of that size. The Tsar and General Jean Victor Moreau, formerly a General of France and by 1813 an adviser to the Coalition, wanted to attack at once; Schwarzenberg wanted to wait until additional forces arrived.

The following day, 26 August, Karl Philipp Fürst zu Schwarzenberg, sent the Coalition force of over 200,000 men to attack Saint-Cyr. The Army of Bohemia was divided into three parts: the Left Wing consisted of Austrians and commanded by Schwarzenberg himself and included the 9 divisions of infantry, 3 divisions of cavalry and 128 guns; the Right Wing consisted of Russians and Prussians under Wittgenstein and included 2 Russian infantry divisions and von Kleist's Prussian corps and 158 guns; the Reserves behind the center consisted of the best Russian and Prussian troops under Barclay de Tolly and included 2 Russian grenadier divisions, 4 Russian Guard cavalry divisions, the Prussian Royal Guard and about 150 guns. The monarchs stayed with the reserves.

In Dresden, Saint-Cyr's XIV Corps manned the various redoubts and defensive positions. From 6:00am to noon, the allies probed the French defenses. Napoleon arrived from the north about 10:00am with the Guard Infantry and Murat's I Cavalry Corps arriving shortly afterwards, covering  in forced marches over three days. Napoleon's Guard consisted of 2 Young Guard Corps and the Old Guard Division.

Shortly after 11:00am, the Coalition monarchs noticed the stream of French troops hurrying into Dresden from the north. There was a lull in the battle between noon and 3:00pm while the French reinforcements took positions and the Coalition leaders pondered whether they should fight Napoleon or withdraw.  The Coalition finally began a bombardment and general assault starting about 3:00pm against the southern suburbs of the city. As the Coalition forces made progress, Napoleon swiftly dispatched reinforcements to the threatened areas – the I Cavalry Corps to the French right, Ney and the II Young Guard Corps to the center and Mortier and the I Young Guard Corps to the French left. At 5:30pm, Napoleon launched his riposte. By nightfall, the French had regained almost all of Saint-Cyr's original positions. As night fell on 26 August, a torrential downpour started that lasted throughout the night. The streams became swollen with water and the ground turned to mud.

After being reinforced overnight with Victor's II Corps, Marmont's VI Corps and the Guard Cavalry, Napoleon attacked the following morning on 27 August in a steady rain, destroyed the allied left flank, and won an impressive tactical victory. The flooded Weisseritz cut off a large portion the left wing of the Allied army, commanded by Johann von Klenau and Ignaz Gyulai, from the Coalition's main body in the center. Marshal Joachim Murat took advantage of this isolation and inflicted heavy losses on the Austrians. A French participant observed, "Murat.... cut off from the Austrian army Klenau's corps, hurling himself upon it at the head of the carabineers and cuirassiers. .... Nearly all his [Klenau's] battalions were compelled to lay down their arms, and two other divisions of infantry shared their fate." Of Klenau's force, Lieutenant Field Marshal Joseph, Baron von Mesko de Felsö-Kubiny's division of five infantry regiments was surrounded and captured by Murat's cavalry, which amounted to approximately 13,000 men, and 15 colours. Mesko was wounded, and retired the following year. Gyulai's divisions also suffered serious losses when they were attacked by Murat's cavalry supported by Victor's II Corps during a rainstorm. With damp flints and powder, their muskets would not fire and many battalions became an easy prey to the French cuirassiers and dragoons.

As the allied left wing was being disintegrated, the French attacked on the allied right wing with Ney, Mortier and Saint-Cyr. Despite desperate charges by the Russian and Prussian cavalry, this flank was also driven back. The French center was held by Marmont's VI Corps but the center was largely limited to an artillery duel. By about 5:00pm, the entire allied force had to slowly pull back even though Schwarzenberg's powerful reserves had not been committed. That night, the Coalition decided that they have had enough and quietly withdrew south. Napoleon did not realize that they had left until the following morning.

An effective rear-guard and the weather allowed Schwarzenberg to withdraw and escape any attempt of encirclement or pursuit. The Coalition had lost some 38,000 men and 40 guns. French casualties totaled around 10,000. Some of Napoleon's officers noted he was "suffering from a violent colic, which had been brought on by the cold rain, to which he had been exposed during the whole 2nd day of the battle."

Aftermath 

On 27 August, General Vandamme received orders to advance on Pirna and bridge the Elbe there with his I Corps. This was accomplished in a pouring rain, without disturbing the Russians drawn up on the heights of Zehista. This advance by Vandamme ran into the midst of the allied forces withdrawing from Dresden and resulted in the Battle of Kulm three days later. After being attacked from all sides, Vandamme was eventually compelled to surrender. This loss along with the defeats of Marshal Oudinot and Marshal MacDonald at the Battle of Katzbach overshadowed Napoleon's victory at Dresden.

Napoleon's old rival Jean Victor Marie Moreau, who had only recently returned from his banishment from the United States, was talking to the Tsar (who wished to see Napoleon defeated) and was mortally wounded in the battle, dying later on 2 September in Louny.

Hoffman
The author and composer E. T. A. Hoffmann happened to be in Dresden during the battle, being at the time employed by a locally based orchestra. On 22 August, after the end of the armistice, the Hoffmann Family was forced to relocate from their pleasant house in the suburbs into the town. During the next few days, as the battle raged, they experienced the ongoing bombardments. As Hoffman later recounted, many people were killed by shells directly in front of him. After the main battle was over, he visited the gory battlefield. His account can be found in Vision auf dem Schlachtfeld bei Dresden.

Notes

References

Further reading

External links
 Battle of Dresden 1813 – maps, illustrations
 Battle of Dresden 1813 Allied Order of Battle
 Battle of Dresden 1813 French Order of Battle
 French Garrison of Dresden, 22 August 1813 (George Nafziger collection)
 Allied Forces at Dresden, 26/27 August 1813 (George Nafziger collection)
 French Forces at Dresden, 26/27 August 1813 (George Nafziger collection)
 Memoirs of the Duke Rovigo

Battles of the War of the Sixth Coalition
Battles of the Napoleonic Wars
Battles inscribed on the Arc de Triomphe
Battles involving France
Battles involving Prussia
Battles involving Russia
Conflicts in 1813
August 1813 events
Battles in Saxony
1813 in Saxony
Battle
Joachim Murat
Alexander I of Russia
Francis II, Holy Roman Emperor